The TCA Career Achievement Award is an award given by the Television Critics Association. The Career Achievement Award annually honors an individual who has inspired his or her work in television. In 2014, director James Burrows became the 30th recipient of the award.

Winners and nominees

References

External links
Official website

Career awards
Lifetime achievement awards
Career